Lyndon Baines Johnson Jr. (born May 23, 1994) is a former American football defensive end. He played college football at Cincinnati.

College career
Johnson began his college career at Holmes Community College, where he played both football and basketball for two seasons before transferring to the University of Cincinnati. Johnson played in 26 games at defensive tackle for the Bearcats in his final two seasons of eligibility and recorded 31 tackles, four tackles for a loss, three sacks and one forced fumble.

Professional career

Jacksonville Jaguars
Johnson signed with the Jacksonville Jaguars as an undrafted free agent on April 30, 2018. He was cut by the Jaguars at the end of the preseason and subsequently re-signed to the team's practice squad on September 2, 2018. Johnson was promoted to the Jaguars active roster on December 14, 2018. He made his NFL debut on December 16, 2018, in a 16–13 loss to the Washington Redskins. He finished his rookie season with two tackles, one of which was for loss, in three games played.

Johnson was waived by the Jaguars on June 3, 2019, but was re-signed on July 23, 2019. Johnson was again waived by the Jaguars during final roster cuts on August 31, 2019.

Tennessee Titans
On September 24, 2019, Johnson was signed to the Tennessee Titans practice squad, but was released one week later on October 1.

Indianapolis Colts 
On October 24, 2019, Johnson was signed to the Indianapolis Colts practice squad, but was released two days later.

Arizona Cardinals
Johnson was signed to the Arizona Cardinals practice squad on December 4, 2019. He signed a reserve/future contract with the Cardinals on December 30, 2019. On April 30, 2020, Johnson was released by the Cardinals.

Personal life
Johnson is named after his father, Lyndon Baines Johnson Sr., who in turn was named after Lyndon Baines Johnson, who was the sitting U.S. president when he was born.

References

External links
Cincinnati Bearcats bio

1994 births
Living people
People from West Point, Mississippi
Players of American football from Mississippi
American football defensive ends
American football defensive tackles
Holmes Bulldogs football players
Cincinnati Bearcats football players
Jacksonville Jaguars players
Tennessee Titans players
Indianapolis Colts players
Arizona Cardinals players